The Ministry of Energy is a ministry in Zambia. It is headed by the Minister of Energy.

In 2012 the Ministry of Water and Energy was merged with the Ministry of Mines to form the Ministry of Mines Energy and Water Development. The merger was reversed in 2015, with the Ministry of Energy and Water Development coming into being. In 2016 Water Development was transferred to the new Ministry of Water Development, Sanitation and Environmental Protection.

List of ministers

Deputy ministers

References

Tourism
Energy in Zambia
 
Zambia